The 1928 Providence Steam Roller season was their fourth in the league. The team improved on their previous season's output of 8–5–1, losing only one game. As the team with the best win percentage, Providence Steam Rollers won the 1928 NFL championship. The Steam Rollers are the last currently defunct NFL franchise to win a championship.

Schedule

Standings

References

Providence Steam Rollers
National Football League championship seasons
Providence Steam Roller seasons